Transrectal ultrasonography, or TRUS in short, is a method of creating an image of organs in the pelvis, most commonly used to perform an ultrasound-guided needle biopsy evaluation of the prostate gland in men with elevated prostate-specific antigen or prostatic nodules on digital rectal exam. TRUS--guided biopsy may reveal prostate cancer, benign prostatic hypertrophy, or prostatitis. TRUS may also detect other diseases of the lower rectum and can be used to stage primary rectal cancer.

References

Urologic procedures
Medical ultrasonography
Digestive system imaging
Prostate cancer